The sourdeline is a bellows-blown bagpipe played in France in the 17th century. 

It was believed to have been of Italian origin, developed in Naples and known as the surdelina.

References

Bagpipes
French musical instruments